William Keane may refer to:

William Keane (author), 19th-century English garden writer
William Keane (sailor) (1899–1949), American Olympic sailor
Will Keane (born 1993), Irish football player
Bill Keane (footballer) (1900–1978), Australian rules footballer
Bil Keane (1922–2011), creator of The Family Circus comic

See also
William Kean (1871–1954), British trade unionist
William Keene (1915–1992), American television actor
William B. Keene (1925–2018), American attorney, judge and television judge
William Keen (disambiguation)